Evolucas is a football club in Guadeloupe, based in the town of Petit-Bourg.

They play in Guadeloupe's first division, the Guadeloupe Championnat National and claimed their first domestic league title in the 2007/2008 season.

Achievements
Guadeloupe Championnat National: 1
 2008

References

External links
 Tour des clubs 2008–2009 – Gwadafoot 
 Club info – French Football Federation 

Football clubs in Guadeloupe